William Exley (2 May 1924 – April 1997) was an English professional footballer who played as a goalkeeper.

Career
Born in Bradford, Exley played for Bradford City and Goole Town.

For Bradford City he made 2 appearances in the Football League.

Sources

}

References

1924 births
1997 deaths
English footballers
Bradford City A.F.C. players
Goole Town F.C. players
English Football League players
Association football goalkeepers